Pacific Caesar is a professional basketball team in Surabaya, Indonesia. They joined the NBL Indonesia in 2011–12 season.

History 
Pacific Caesar Surabaya is one of the oldest basketball clubs in Indonesia. After stumbling through the Indonesian professional basketball league, they are now one of the most promising clubs. The existence of Pacific Caesar as a basketball club is also not in doubt, because they have been more than half a century. Club Pacific was founded in 1968. To be precise, on May 8, 1968 as an amateur club. Pacific was founded by Bambang Susanto since he was 17 years old, and continues to manage this club until now. Pak Bambang's dream of establishing Pacific was actually simple. He wanted to set up a basketball school for young people, and now Pacific was complete as a club. Have a professional team, coaching that go hand in hand, and a sports hall as the main supporting facilities. Pacific's journey in professional basketball competition began in 1992 at the Main Basketball Competition (Kobatama). Apart from Pacific, there were teams from East Java, namely Golden Hand and Halim Kediri. After running for a long time, Pacific declared retirement from the league for a decade (2000-2010). They had tried their luck in the Premier Basketball League (PBL). In the 2010-2011 PBL season, Pacific was the runner-up. Pacific finally returned to the highest caste of Indonesian basketball. Pacific began to appear again on the national basketball scene to be precise at the 2011-2012 NBL Indonesia. But during its four years of participation, Pacific always failed to get positive results. Pacific always inhabits the bottom of the standings in the regular season. Various ways have been done by Pacific to improve performance, such as changing coaches. Pacific was once polished by a coach from the Philippines, Arturo Lozada Cristobal. Then in the following season (2012-2013) they were led by Eddy Santoso. The two coaches took turns handling Pacific in the next two seasons. However, the last one who coached Pacific at NBL Indonesia 2014-2015 was Arturo Lozada Cristobal. At IBL 2016, Pacific Caesar appeared with a new face. Coach Bai (Arturo Lozada Cristobal) is no longer head coach. Pacific is handled by Bambang Susanto himself, who is also the owner of the club. Suk Fuk - his nickname - was accompanied by an assistant coach, the late Hari Suharsono. The results are the same, Pacific has yet to get maximum results. Because they appear with new faces of young players. Pacific's performance improved sharply during the 2017 IBL era. They benefited from a league policy that included two foreign players. Pacific management is very careful in choosing players. They got a guard from the United States, David Seagers, and forward from Canada, Kevin Loiselle. Their presence succeeded in bringing Pacific to the top, as well as for the first time Pacific was able to appear in the playoffs. Bisih as a coach was also nominated for the IBL 2016 Coach of The Year. Unfortunately they failed to continue their steps after losing two games in the playoffs from Aspac Jakarta. Pacific has shown brilliant achievements in two consecutive seasons thereafter. They entered the playoffs at the 2017-2018 IBL, and even reached the semifinals at the 2018-2019 IBL. Pacific is no longer a team that is the butt in the league. They are now transformed into one of the great strengths of Indonesian basketball. One might look at Pacific's accomplishments in recent years. But the truth is that Pacific is a great team, with a long history and proud achievements.

NBL/IBL Record

Roster

Awards

Defensive Player of The Year 

 Indra Muhammad (2020)

Notable players

To appear in this section a player must have either:
- Set a club record or won an individual award as a professional player.

- Played at least one official international match for his senior national team or one NBA game at any time.
 Dian Heryadi
 Indra Muhamad
 Muhammad Nur Aziz Wardana

References

Basketball teams in Indonesia
Sport in Surabaya
Basketball teams established in 1968
1968 establishments in Indonesia